Gastrotheca nicefori (common name: Niceforo's marsupial frog) is a species of frog in the family Hemiphractidae. It is found in the Andes of Colombia (the three cordilleras: Cordillera Occidental, Cordillera Central, and Cordillera Oriental), on the Andean slopes of northern Venezuela, and in the highlands of eastern and central Panama.

Etymology
The specific name nicefori honors , a priest and naturalist of French origin.

Description
The dorsum is light brown, with the sides being darker than the upper surface. Its coloration may get lighter during the day. The ventrum is light grey or greyish brown. The finger and toe discs are relatively large. The fingers and toes and lightly webbed.

The male advertisement call consists of a number of chicken-like "clucks". The female carries the eggs in a pouch on her back. The development is direct.

Habitat and conservation
It can also survive in disturbed cloud forest. It is an arboreal species living in forest canopy.

It is an abundant species that can be locally threatened by pollution from the spraying of illegal crops. It occurs in several protected areas through its range.

References

nicefori
Amphibians of the Andes
Amphibians of Colombia
Amphibians of Panama
Amphibians of Venezuela
Taxa named by Helen Beulah Thompson Gaige
Amphibians described in 1933
Taxonomy articles created by Polbot